The following is a list of principals and presidents of Towson University and its predecessor institutions.

External links
Towson President Biographies

Towson University
 
Towson